The Tshilongo River is a river in the southeast of the Democratic Republic of the Congo.

Course

The watershed of the Tshilongo River, which flows from north to south, is west of the watershed of the Dipeta and Mofia rivers.
The Tshilongo River originates just south of the village of Tshilongo and flows south-east to Tenke.
Along this stretch the RP615 provincial highway and the Lubudi–Tenke railway run parallel to the river.
The Tshilongo River then runs south from Tenke to join the Kando River.
The Kando flows west to join the Lualaba River near Kolwezi.

A new plant species, Streptocarpus malachiticola, was found along the Tshilongo in the rocks bordering the right bank near Kabwe village in 1980.

History

The Compagnie de Chemin de fer du Katanga opened the  section of the Lubumbashi – Bukama line that ran from Kamatanda Junction to Tenke and the Tshilongo River on 15 July 1914. The  section from the Tshilongo River to Lubudi opened on 1 April 1918.
The Benguela Railway ran  through Portuguese West Africa (Angola) from Lobito Bay on the Atlantic to the border of Katanga province in the Belgian Congo.
It opened to the border on 10 June 1929.
The next step was construction of the  section from the frontier to the Tshilongo at Tenke.
The Dilolo–Tenke line opened on 26 April 1931.

During Operation Grandslam, where United Nations peacekeeping forces attacked the secessionist State of Katanga, on 17 January 1963 forward elements of the 99th Brigade reached the Tshilongo River where they were ordered to halt.
That afternoon Moïse Tshombe formally surrendered.

Notes

Sources

Lualaba River
Rivers of the Democratic Republic of the Congo
Tributaries of the Congo River